Joseph Bowman Farmhouse is a historic home located near Garrett in Keyser Township, DeKalb County, Indiana.  It was built in 1875, and is a two-story, Italianate-style brick dwelling. It has a gable roof and one-story polygonal bay.

It was added to the National Register of Historic Places in 1983.

References

Houses on the National Register of Historic Places in Indiana
Italianate architecture in Indiana
Houses completed in 1875
Houses in DeKalb County, Indiana
National Register of Historic Places in DeKalb County, Indiana